Aq Qabr (also Romanized as Āq Qabr) is a village in Gorganbuy Rural District, in the Central District of Aqqala County, Golestan Province, Iran. At the 2006 census, its population was 639, in 128 families.

References 

Populated places in Aqqala County